Beaverburn was a  fast cargo liner which was built in 1944 for Britain's Ministry of War Transport (MoWT) as Empire Captain. In 1946 she was sold to Canada and renamed Beaverburn. In 1960, she was sold back to Britain and renamed Bennachie. In 1964, she was sold to Liberia and renamed Silvana. She served until 1971 when she was scrapped.

Description
The ship was built under the Empire ships programme by Caledon Shipbuilding & Engineering Co Ltd, Dundee, as yard number 404. She was launched on 25 February 1944 and completed in July.

Her GRT was 9,875, with a NRT of 7,110. Her DWT was 11,975. She was propelled two steam turbines, driving a single screw propeller via double reduction gearing.

History
Empire Captain was built for the MoWT. She was placed under the management of T & J Harrison Ltd. The Official Number 166217 and Code Letters BFKF were allocated; her port of registry was Dundee. She was a member of a number of convoys during the Second World War.

UC 50A
Convoy UC 50A departed Liverpool on 24 December 1944 bound for New York. Empire Captain was bound for Cape Town, South Africa.

UC 65A
Convoy UC 65 departed St Helens Roads on 23 April 1945 bound for New York. Empire Captain was bound for Cristóbal, Panama.

In 1946, Empire Captain was sold to the Canadian Pacific Railway and renamed Beaverburn, the second Canadian Pacific ship to bear this name. Her port of registry was changed to London. She was placed under the management of Canadian Pacific Steamship Co. In April 1947, Beaverburn was the first ship to reach Montreal once the port had opened after having been closed for the winter by ice. Her captain, John Bisset Smith, received the traditional gold-headed cane for this achievement.

In 1960, Beaverburn was sold to Ben Line Steamers Ltd of Scotland, and renamed SS Bennachie. Her port of registry was changed to Leith.

In 1964, Bennachie was sold to Atlantic Navigation Corporation, Liberia. She was placed under the management of W H Eddie Hsu, Formosa. Silvana served until 1971 when she was sold for scrap. She arrived for scrapping on 6 April 1971 at Kaohsiung, Taiwan.

References

External links
Photo of Beaverburn

1944 ships
Ships built in Dundee
Cargo liners
Ministry of War Transport ships
Empire ships
Steamships of the United Kingdom
Merchant ships of the United Kingdom
Steamships of Liberia
Merchant ships of Liberia